Stratos Chintzidis (born 13 December 1987) is a Greek professional footballer who plays as a left back for Super League 2 club Chania.

Career
Chintzidis started his career with Polykastro in 2006. Subsequently, he played for Enosi Alexandroupoli, Fokikos, Anagennisi Giannitsa, Eordaikos 2007 and Pontioi Katerini. Chintzidis signed for Paniliakos in January 2012. On 24 July 2012, he signed a contract with Apollon Smyrnis spending the entire 2012–13 season with the club and getting crowned Football League champion. On 13 August 2013, he signed a contract with Greek Football League club Iraklis, but he was released in November before appearing in any official matches. A few weeks later he signed for Panachaiki. He was released from the club in July 2014. On 7 August 2017, Trikala officially announced the signing of the experienced defender. On 24 March 2018, he scored his first goal with a magnificent long free-kick in a 1–1 away draw against Apollon Pontou. On 14 July 2018, he joined Kissamikos on a free transfer. Roughly a month later, however, he terminated his contract with the team and joined Iraklis.

Honours
Apollon Smyrnis
Greek Football League: 2012–13

References

External links

1987 births
Living people
Greek footballers
Fokikos A.C. players
Paniliakos F.C. players
Apollon Smyrnis F.C. players
Iraklis Thessaloniki F.C. players
Panachaiki F.C. players
Olympiacos Volos F.C. players
PAE Kerkyra players
Trikala F.C. players
Association football fullbacks
Footballers from Alexandroupolis